Raghunatha Shiromani (IAST: Raghunātha Śiromaṇi) was an Indian philosopher and logician. He was the head ( The Chancellor ) of the Ancient Mithila University also known as Mithila Vidyapeeth. He was born in a brahmin family at Nabadwip in present-day Nadia district of West Bengal state. He was a pupil of Vāsudeva Sārvabhauma. He brought the new school of Nyaya, Navya Nyāya, representing the final development of Indian formal logic, to its zenith of analytic power.

Raghunatha's analysis of relations revealed the true nature of number, inseparable from the abstraction of natural phenomena, and his studies of metaphysics dealt with the negation or nonexistence of a complex reality.

References

External links
Raghunatha: A Name of Negatives, descriptive information of Raghunatha with some controversial issues (his connection with Mahaprabhu Shri Chaitanya) and bibliography
Language: From I-dentity to My-dentity, the contemporary deployment of a new category, svatva ( endowment, possessed-ness, entitlement, my-ness), introduced by Raghunatha

1470s births
1550 deaths
16th-century Indian philosophers
16th-century Hindu philosophers and theologians
Indian logicians
15th-century Indian philosophers
Nyaya
Metaphysicians
People from Nadia district
Scholars from West Bengal

15th-century Indian mathematicians